Plymouth County is the name of two counties in the United States:

 Plymouth County, Iowa
 Plymouth County, Massachusetts